Major League Baseball 2K5 (MLB 2K5) is an MLB licensed baseball simulation video game published by 2K Sports. MLB 2K5 is available for PlayStation 2 and Xbox. The previous game in the series made by Sega Sports was ESPN Major League Baseball back in 2004. The first edition of the series, powered by ESPN. Unlike the other "2K5" branded sports games, This was published by 2K Sports, making it the first Visual Concepts-developed sports game not to be published by Sega, though Sega's logos are still seen in the background of menus and ballparks. (These logos and the ESPN Graphics would be removed and replaced by 2K Sports' logos in the World Series Edition) The game included Web Gems instant replays, K-Zone pitching, Slam Zone hitting, and baserunner mode. The game was released in late February 2005 on the PlayStation 2 and Xbox consoles. The cover baseball player was New York Yankees shortstop Derek Jeter. Later that year, an upgraded version titled Major League Baseball 2K5: World Series Edition was released during the 2005 MLB postseason.

Commentators
The commentary is delivered by the ESPN Sunday Night Baseball crew of Jon Miller and Joe Morgan. Karl Ravech introduces the games from the studio.

Features
Exhibition: Play against the computer or head-to-head with another player.

Franchise: Play multiple seasons with a team.

GM Career Mode: Become a team's GM and try to accomplish certain goals given by the owner while building a good team.

Online: MLB 2K5s online mode includes both games and online leagues.

Reception

MLB 2K5

The game received "favorable" reviews on both platforms according to the review aggregation website Metacritic. GameSpot said that "what sets MLB 2K5 apart from other baseball video games is how great it looks and sounds ... Major League Baseball 2K5 is a big step in the right direction for Take-Two's (formerly Sega's) video game baseball franchise. Last year's game, to be kind, was full of bugs and had modes that didn't actually work as advertised. All of the modes in this year's game work like they should and there seem to be hardly any bugs, although the few you will probably run across do have the potential to be very annoying." IGN wrote that "MLB 2K5 still has a ways to go if it intends to compete with the memory of MVP next year. The animations need a complete overhaul, the AI definitely needs a reworking, and the Franchise Mode has to see significant innovation outside of a nicer interface", but that overall "MLB 2K5 is a great experience worthy of a spot on your shelf."

World Series Edition

The World Series Edition received "generally favorable reviews" on both platforms, a bit higher than the original MLB 2K5, but both a few points shy of "universal acclaim", according to Metacritic.

Exclusive license
In 2005, in response to EA Sports' exclusive license with the National Football League and ESPN prohibiting any NFL 2K games for the foreseeable future, Take-Two Interactive signed an exclusive third-party licensing contract with Major League Baseball (MLB), MLBPA and MLBAM to produce MLB games. The agreement, which ran from Spring 2006 to 2012, allowed for the console manufacturers Sony, Microsoft, and Nintendo to produce MLB titles for their respective platforms, but barred third party developers such as EA Sports from continuing or developing their own MLB games.

References

External links
 

2K Sports games
Major League Baseball video games
Xbox games
PlayStation 2 games
Sports video games set in the United States
Take-Two Interactive games
MLB 2K
2005 video games
Video games developed in the United States
Video games set in Maryland
RenderWare games